The 3rd FINA World Swimming Championships (25 m) were an international swimming meet organized by FINA. It was held at the Scandinavium in Gothenburg, Sweden April 17−20, 1997; and featured 501 swimmers from 71 nations.

Competing nations
The 71 nations with swimmers at the 1997 Short Course Worlds were:

Results

Men

Women

Medal table

References

External links

SVT's open archive 

FINA World Swimming Championships (25 m)
FINA Short Course World Championships
S
International sports competitions in Gothenburg
S
FINA World Swimming Championships (25 m)
1990s in Gothenburg